Hiram Burgos (born August 4, 1987) is a Puerto Rican former professional baseball pitcher. He played in Major League Baseball (MLB) for the Milwaukee Brewers.

Early life
When he was three years old his parents, Hiram Burgos Delgado and Ivette Irizarry Arce, introduced him to the sport by visiting baseball parks. He attended the Puerto Rico Baseball Academy and High School and Bethune-Cookman College. Burgos expected to be selected in the 2008 Major League Baseball draft after recording a 9–1 season while pitching for Bethune-Cookman University, but was disappointed after going undrafted. As a consequence of this, he decided to complete his bachelor's degree following the insistence of his mother.

Professional career
Burgos was drafted by the Milwaukee Brewers in the 6th round of the 2009 Major League Baseball draft. The Brewers added him to their 40-man roster after the 2012 season.

The Brewers promoted Burgos to the major leagues on April 19, 2013 and subsequently made his major league debut on April 20, 2013. His first career start came the same day at home against the Chicago Cubs. On May 11, Burgos had an ineffective start against the Cincinnati Reds, allowing 12 runs (10 earned) in just 3 innings pitched. A day after his sixth start of the season on May 21, Burgos was placed on the 15-day disabled list with a right shoulder impingement.

Burgos was released by the Brewers on September 2, 2014, and signed a minor league contract with them on January 30, 2015. On December 15, 2016, Burgos signed another minor league contract with the Brewers that included an invitation to spring training.

Burgos was invited to join the Brewers' spring training roster for 2017 and started in the Brewers' first game against the University of Wisconsin-Milwaukee. Burgos pitched two scoreless innings. He elected free agency on November 6, 2017, and then re-signed with the Brewers on a minor league contract in February 2018. He was released by the Brewers organization on October 2, 2018.

Coaching career
Burgos retired after the 2018 season and was hired as the pitching coach for the AZL Brewers.

Burgos is now the pitching coach for the Appleton Timber Rattlers, High Class A, Milwaukee Brewers.

International career

World Baseball Classic
Burgos has played for the Puerto Rican national team twice, in the 2013 World Baseball Classic and in the 2017 World Baseball Classic, winning in both tournaments the silver medal.

See also
 List of Major League Baseball players from Puerto Rico

References

External links

1987 births
Living people
Milwaukee Brewers players
Bethune–Cookman Wildcats baseball players
Wisconsin Timber Rattlers players
Brevard County Manatees players
Huntsville Stars players
Nashville Sounds players
People from Cayey, Puerto Rico
2013 World Baseball Classic players
2017 World Baseball Classic players
Major League Baseball players from Puerto Rico
Minor league baseball coaches
Helena Brewers players
Indios de Mayagüez players
Tigres del Licey players
Puerto Rican expatriate baseball players in the Dominican Republic
Major League Baseball pitchers
Biloxi Shuckers players
Colorado Springs Sky Sox players